Ardouin is a French surname. Notable people with the surname include:

Beaubrun Ardouin (1796–1865), Haitian historian and politician
Céligny Ardouin (1806–1849), Haitian historian and politician
Coriolan Ardouin (1812–1836), Haitian poet
Nicolas Ardouin (born 1978), French footballer

See also
Ardoin

French-language surnames